Putting or put down may refer to:
 Animal euthanasia
 Putdown, a form of incivility
 Wicket#Putting down a wicket, in cricket